Edgecumbe is a town of the North Island of New Zealand.

Edgecumbe may also refer to:

 Edgecumbe Bay, a bay in Queensland, Australia, and Cape Edgecumbe nearby
 George Edgecumbe (1845–1930), New Zealand newspaper proprietor and businessman
 Lodena Edgecumbe (1906–1978), American dancer and dance educator
 Peter Edgecumbe (died 1539) (c. 1468–1539), English courtier, sheriff and politician
 Piers Edgecumbe (c. 1609–1667), English politician

See also
 Mount Edgecumbe (disambiguation)
 Edgcumbe (disambiguation)
 Edgecomb (disambiguation)